Lauren Opremcak Bakaletz is a Professor of both Pediatrics and Otolaryngology at Ohio State University as well as the director of the Center for Microbial Pathogenesis at The Research Institute at Nationwide Children's Hospital in Columbus, Ohio.

Research 
The Bakaletz lab studies the molecular mechanisms behind polymicrobial infections - particularly Haemophilus influenzae and Moraxella catarrhalis - in a variety of human disease states, including the respiratory tract and infections of the middle ear (otitis media).

Awards  
Bakaletz was elected to the American Academy of Microbiology in 2020.

References 

American microbiologists
Women microbiologists
Scientists from Ohio
Living people
Year of birth missing (living people)